Qavamabad (also Romanized as Qavāmābād and Ghavam Abad) is a village in Kezab Rural District, Khezrabad District, Saduq County, Yazd Province, Iran. At the 2006 census, its population was 86, in 36 families.

References 

Populated places in Saduq County